Western Hills is an area in Cincinnati, Ohio. Western Hills has been described as "more idea than geography" as it is not a properly defined neighborhood or location. It contains Western Hills High School and various shopping centers and businesses with Western Hills in their names. Areas south of Westwood, Ohio, such as Covedale, Price Hill, and some parts of Green Township are sometimes referred to as Western Hills.

The Western Hills Viaduct is a bridge spanning Interstate 75, exit 2 northbound and exit 2B southbound, providing access to western Cincinnati neighborhoods.

References

External links
 Western Hills Viaduct at Cincinnati-Transit.net
 https://www.cincinnati.com/story/news/2018/11/26/finding-western-hills-cincinnati-not-neighborhood-city-place-residents-swear-exists/2060651002/

Neighborhoods in Cincinnati